Kepi is a type of cap.

Kepi may also refer to:

People
 Kepi Ghoulie, lead singer for the Groovie Ghoulies
 Bruno Kepi (born 1988), Albanian footballer
 Marko Kepi, Albanian American president of Albanian Roots
 Myrteza Kepi, Albanian hero honored on a 1969 Albanian postage stamp

Places
 Kepi Bar, a mountain in both Albania and the Republic of Macedonia
 Kepi, Indonesia, the capital of Mappi Regency in the Papua province

Other
 KEPI, an American Christian radio station licensed to Eagle Pass, Texas
 Képi Blanc (publication), official publication of the French Foreign Legion
 Le Képi, a 1943 novel by Colette
 KEPI, an alias for PPP1R14C, a human gene that encodes for protein phosphatase 1 regulatory subunit 14C
 Kharkov Engineering Pedagogics Institute (KEPI), former name of Ukrainian Engineering Pedagogics Academy